Jose Lorenzo "Pepe" Diokno III (born August 13, 1987) is a Filipino film director, producer, and screenwriter. His debut film, Engkwentro premiered at the 2009 Venice Film Festival and received the Lion of the Future ("Luigi de Laurentiis") Award for Best Debut Film, as well as the Orizzonti Prize.

He has since produced feature films, including Above the Clouds and Kapatiran.

Early life and career 

Diokno was born in Manila, the first of six children of Chel Diokno, a lawyer and the founding dean of the De La Salle University (DLSU) College of Law, and Divina Aromin, a writer. He was named after his grandfather, the late Philippine senator and freedom fighter, Jose W. Diokno, the father of human rights and founder of the Free Legal Assistance Group (FLAG), who died six months before he was born. Pepe's great-great-grandfather is Gen. Ananías Diokno, leader of the Visayan forces during the 1896 Revolution and war against the United States.

Diokno attended La Salle Green Hills for grade school and high school, and the University of the Philippines to take up a bachelor's degree in film.

In 2006, at 17 years old, Diokno made his first short film, an eight-minute dark comedy entitled No Passport Needed. The film was a finalist at the second Cinemalaya Independent Film Festival. This was followed in 2008, by a short documentary entitled Dancing For Discipline, which tells the story of the dancing inmates at the Cebu Provincial Detention and Rehabilitation Center. The documentary was produced by Rock Ed Philippines and The Asia Foundation and enabled Diokno to visit detention facilities around the Philippines. It was at one such facility, in Davao City, that he met two brothers that would inspire his first feature film.

Career

Film 

In 2009, at 21-years-old and still a student at the University of the Philippines, Diokno made his debut feature, Engkwentro. Produced on a meager budget, it tells the story of two teenage brothers on the run from a vigilante death squad, while throughout the film, the omnipresent voice of an iron-fisted mayor blasts on. The film premiered at the 2009 Cinemalaya Independent Film Festival, and was then selected to the 2009 Venice Film Festival, where it received the Lion of the Future - "Luigi de Laurentiis" Award for Best Debut Film, as well as the Orizzonti Prize for new trends in cinema. It also received the NETPAC Award for Best Asian Film at the 2010 Jeonju International Film Festival, and the Gawad Urian for Best Editing.

Diokno's second film, Above the Clouds premiered at the 2014 Tokyo International Film Festival and was nominated Best Film at the 2014 Singapore International Film Festival. The family drama tells the story of an orphaned teenage boy and his estranged grandfather embarking on a journey to overcome their grief. The Filipino-French co-production took three years to make, and was produced with the support of France's Aide aux cinemas du monde, South Korea's Asian Cinema Fund, Switzerland's Visions Sud Est and the Arte Prize from the 2012 Berlin International Film Festival.

In 2015, Diokno produced his third feature, Kapatiran, an experimental film cum cinematic essay on fraternities and Filipino society’s tribal nature. It was an Official Selection at the Karlovy Vary International Film Festival, and was a grantee of the QCinema International Film Festival. In some ways, the film was a return to Diokno's roots — a low-budget, realist work of social commentary. Critics described the film as “absolutely brave", “exceptionally personal  and powerful", “Harsh, heartening,  dizzying, and deadly", and “a fascinating experiment".

Other projects 

Diokno has made short films and commercials with companies such as Jollibee, P&G, Unilever, BPI, and many others. He directed the Kwentong Jollibee film Date and the Safeguard film Pabaon sa Buhay. Both these films set viral video records and international advertising awards.

During the COVID-19 crisis in 2020, Diokno gathered celebrities and produced a series of pro-bono commercials for the Department of Health to raise awareness about the virus among Filipinos with no access to the Internet.

Diokno is chairman of the independent production company Epicmedia. He co-produced Lav Diaz’s Berlin Silver Bear winner, Hele sa Hiwagang Hapis, and the box office hit That Thing Called Tadhana by Antoinette Jadaone.

Filmography

Ancestry

References

External links
Pepe Diokno - Official website

1987 births
Filipino film directors
Living people
Tagalog people
LGBT film directors
Filipino LGBT comedians
20th-century LGBT people
21st-century LGBT people
People from Manila
Filipino screenwriters
Filipino film producers
University of the Philippines Diliman alumni
Diokno family
Filipino people of Indian descent